Ribes humile, (ai cu li in Chinese, meaning swamp currant) is a tufted, dioecious shrub native to China, namely in Sichuan province. It is found along the sides of roads in montane woods and thickets, at 1000–3300 meters above sea-level.

Minute flowers arrive in May through June; hairless, red, globular fruits forming in July to August.

References 

humile
Plants described in 1910
Flora of China
Dioecious plants